Jean-François Amiguet (born 1950) is a Swiss film director and screenwriter. His film Lounge Chair was screened in the Un Certain Regard section at the 1988 Cannes Film Festival.

Filmography
 Alexandre (1983)
 La méridienne (1988)
 Le film du cinéma suisse (1991)
 L'écrivain public (1993)
 Histoires de fête (2000)
 Au sud des nuages (2003)
 Elle est pas belle, la vie? on Gérald Métroz (2006)

References

External links

1950 births
Living people
Swiss film directors
Swiss screenwriters
Male screenwriters